This is a list of members of the Queensland Legislative Council from 1 January 1900 to 31 December 1909. Appointments, made by the Governor of Queensland, were for life, although many members for one reason or another resigned.

The Council's size grew from 41 to 44 members, however, at times during the decade, as few as 35 members sat in the Chamber. The first Labour members of the Chamber were appointed under the Morgan-Kidston coalition.

Office bearers

President of the Legislative Council:
 Hugh Nelson (13 April 1898 – 1 January 1906)
 Arthur Morgan (19 January 1906 – 19 December 1916)

Chairman of Committees:
 Frederic Brentnall (26 May 1893 – 22 July 1902)
 Albert Norton (23 July 1902 – 5 August 1907)
 Peter MacPherson (6 August 1907 – 12 September 1913)

Members

Members shaded red were Labour Party members of the Council.

References

 Waterson, Duncan Bruce: Biographical Register of the Queensland Parliament 1860-1929 (second edition), Sydney 2001.
 Alphabetical Register of Members (Queensland Parliament)
 

Members of Queensland parliaments by term
20th-century Australian politicians
19th-century Australian politicians